Whoop-Dee-Doo is a Broadway musical by Weber and Fields that played in 1903–1904.  The book was by Edgar Smith.

References

Broadway musicals
1903 musicals